The Schiberg (2,044 m) is a mountain of the Schwyz Alps, located on the border between the Swiss cantons of Schwyz and Glarus. It overlooks the Wägitalersee on its west side.

References

External links
Schiberg on Hikr

Mountains of the Alps
Mountains of Switzerland
Mountains of the canton of Schwyz
Mountains of the canton of Glarus
Glarus–Schwyz border